Cumaca Cave is a large cave system located in northern Trinidad, in the southeastern area of the Northern Range. This cave is sometimes also called Oropouche.  The caves are home to bats and Oilbirds (Steatornis caripensis). These are the only nocturnal fruit eating birds in the world. They forage at night, navigating by echolocation in the same way as bats, but with a high-pitched clicking sound audible to humans.

The cave is also home to hypogean fishes. Most notably the semi-blind catfish, Rhamdia quelen or South American Catfish, which was at first believed to be a distinct cave species and was named Caecorhamdia urichi. But it is now known as a troglobite form of Rhamdia quelen, with reduced eye size and reduced pigmentation.

Footnotes

References
 Aldemaro Romero. (2002). "Replacement of the Troglomorphic Population of Rhamdia quelen (Pisces: Pimelodidae) by an Epigean Population of the Same Species in the Cumaca Cave." Copeia, Vol. 2002, December 2002.
 Snow, D.W. (2008). Birds in Our Life. William Sessions Limited.  (pbk).

External links
Oilbird Caves of Trinidad Accessed 30 March 2011
"Rhamdia quelen (Quoy & Gaimard, 1824) South American catfish."

Natural history of Trinidad and Tobago
Caves of Trinidad and Tobago
Caves of the Caribbean